The Pyongyang Grand Theatre is a theatre located in North Korea. It was opened in 1960.

See also 
 List of theatres in North Korea

References 

Theatres in North Korea
Theatres completed in 1960
Buildings and structures in Pyongyang
1960 establishments in North Korea
20th-century architecture in North Korea